Glossa may refer to several things:

 glossa (γλῶσσα), a Greek word meaning "tongue" or "language", used in several English words including gloss, glossary, glossitis, and others
 Glossa (journal), a peer-reviewed academic journal of linguistics established as a successor to Lingua
 glossai (glossai hosei puros)  - Apostles' marvelous gift of understanding of all the languages from the Holy Spirit on the Day of Pentecost
 glossa (music), a Spanish musical form, cultivated by Eduard Toldrà and others
 Glossa Music, a Spanish music label
 Glossa Ordinaria, a medieval scholarly Bible in which the text is surrounded by learned commentary
 Glossai Greek plural (Γλῶσσαι), a glossary by Hesychius of Alexandria Glossae sacrae, Latin plural "holy tongues", a book which is an interpolation to Hesychius' work of a later date than his own
 Possible misspelling of Glosa (a constructed language)

Places in Greece
 Glossa, Skopelos, a village in the island of Skopelos in the Northern Sporades
 Glossa, Chania, a village in the Chania (regional unit)
 Glossa, Elis, a cape in the Elis (regional unit)
 Glossa, Syros, a cape in the Syros island of the Cyclades 

Greek language